The 1922–23 NCAA men's basketball season began in December 1922, progressed through the regular season and conference tournaments, and concluded in March 1923.

Season headlines 

 In February 1943, the Helms Athletic Foundation retroactively selected Kansas as its national champion for the 1922–23 season.
 In 1995, the Premo-Porretta Power Poll retroactively selected Army as its national champion for the 1922–23 season.

Conference membership changes

Regular season

Conference winners and tournaments 

NOTE: The Southern Intercollegiate men's basketball tournament included teams from both the Southern Conference and the Southern Intercollegiate Athletic Association. Although it was a regional rather than conference tournament whose champion claimed the mythical title of "Champions of the South," the Southern Conference considered it the "official" Southern Conference tournament for 1923.

Statistical leaders

Awards

Helms College Basketball All-Americans 

The practice of selecting a Consensus All-American Team did not begin until the 1928–29 season. The Helms Athletic Foundation later retroactively selected a list of All-Americans for the 1922–23 season.

Major player of the year awards 

 Helms Player of the Year: Paul Endacott, Kansas (retroactive selection in 1944)

Coaching changes 

A number of teams changed coaches during the season and after it ended.

References